Thanjavur is a Lok Sabha (Parliament of India) constituency in Tamil Nadu. Its Tamil Nadu Parliamentary Constituency number is 30 of 39.

Assembly segments
In 2007 the Election Commission of India  revised and redrew this Thanjavur Lok Sabha constituency to include the following new state assembly constituencies -

From 2009, elections were conducted based on the above demarcation.

Thanjavur Lok Sabha constituency was previously composed of the following assembly segments:
Orathanad
Thiruvonam
Thanjavur
Tiruvaiyaru
Papanasam
Valangiman (SC)

Members of the Parliament

Election Results

General Election 2019

General Election 2014

General Election 2009

General Election 2004

See also
 Thanjavur
 List of Constituencies of the Lok Sabha

References

 Election Commission of India

External links
Thanjavur lok sabha  constituency election 2019 date and schedule

Lok Sabha constituencies in Tamil Nadu
Thanjavur